Spirals is the third and final album by metalcore band Blood Has Been Shed. The album was released June 27, 2003 through Ferret Music. A music video was released for the song "She Speaks to Me."

Track listing

Personnel
Blood Has Been Shed
Howard Jones – lead vocals
Corey Unger – guitar, backing vocals
John Lynch – bass
Justin Foley – drums

Additional personnel
Zeuss – producer, engineer
Jeff Lipton – mastering
Jeff Gros – photography
Asterisk Studio – art direction, design

References

2003 albums
Blood Has Been Shed albums
Ferret Music albums